Timothy Louis Peterson (born February 22, 1991) is an American professional baseball pitcher for the Leones de Yucatán of the Mexican League. He has played in Major League Baseball (MLB) for the New York Mets.

Career
Peterson graduated from Emerald Ridge High School in Puyallup, Washington and played college baseball at Western Nevada College and the University of Kentucky. In 2012, as a junior at Kentucky, he went 3-0 with a 2.42 ERA in 26 innings.

New York Mets
He was drafted by the New York Mets in the 20th round of the 2012 Major League Baseball draft and signed.

After signing, Peterson made his professional debut that year with the Brooklyn Cyclones and spent the whole season there, going 1-1 with a 6.26 ERA in 23 innings pitched in relief. In 2013, he pitched 17.2 scoreless innings for Brooklyn, and in 18 games pitched for the Savannah Sand Gnats, he was 1-0 with a 5.13 ERA. Peterson began 2014 with Savannah, and after pitching to a 3-0 record and 2.05 ERA in 19 relief appearances, he was promoted to the St. Lucie Mets where he was 2-1 with a 5.70 ERA in 23.2 relief innings pitched. He also pitched in one game for the Binghamton Mets at the end of the season. Prior to the 2015 season, Peterson received an 80-game suspension after testing positive for a performance-enhancing drug. After serving his suspension, he played for Savannah where he compiled a 1-0 record and 1.69 ERA in 16 relief appearances. In 2016, he pitched for both St. Lucie and Binghamton, pitching to a 4-1 record and 3.03 ERA in 62.1 innings pitched out of the bullpen. In 2017, he pitched two games for the Las Vegas 51s along with 41 games for Binghamton in which he was 5-3 with a 1.14 ERA.  He began 2018 with Las Vegas.

Peterson was called up to the majors for the first time on May 30, 2018. He made his debut that night against the Atlanta Braves at SunTrust Park, allowing a home run to Johan Camargo in two innings of work.

Peterson was called up to the majors on May 5, 2019 after starting the season with the Syracuse Mets. He appeared in one game and was sent down the next day on May 6. On August 16, 2019, Peterson was designated for assignment. He elected free agency on October 1.

Los Angeles Angels
On April 5, 2021, Peterson signed with the Lexington Legends of the Atlantic League of Professional Baseball. On May 18, prior to the ALPB season, Peterson's contract was purchased by the Los Angeles Angels.

Wild Health Genomes
On April 12, 2022, Peterson signed with the Wild Health Genomes of the Atlantic League of Professional Baseball.

Leones de Yucatán
On July 13, 2022, Peterson's contract was purchased by the Leones de Yucatán of the Mexican League.

References

External links

1991 births
Living people
American sportspeople in doping cases
Baseball players from Washington (state)
Baseball players suspended for drug offenses
Binghamton Mets players
Binghamton Rumble Ponies players
Brooklyn Cyclones players
Kentucky Wildcats baseball players
Las Vegas 51s players
Major League Baseball pitchers
New York Mets players
Salt Lake Bees players
Savannah Sand Gnats players
Scottsdale Scorpions players
Sportspeople from Puyallup, Washington
St. Lucie Mets players
Syracuse Mets players
Toros del Este players
American expatriate baseball players in the Dominican Republic
La Crosse Loggers players
Rochester Honkers players